Vasiliki "Vicky" Theodoridou (born 27 January 1982), is a Greek handball player who competed in the 2004 Summer Olympics.

References

1982 births
Living people
Greek female handball players
Olympic handball players of Greece
Handball players at the 2004 Summer Olympics